Ozodes is a genus of beetles in the family Cerambycidae, containing the following species:

 Ozodes flavitarsis Gounelle, 1911
 Ozodes ibidiinus Bates, 1870
 Ozodes infuscatus Bates, 1870
 Ozodes malthinoides Bates, 1870
 Ozodes multituberculatus Bates, 1870
 Ozodes nodicollis Audinet-Serville, 1834
 Ozodes sexmaculatus Zajciw, 1967
 Ozodes xanthophasma Bates, 1872

References

Necydalopsini